7-Dehydrositosterol is a sterol which serves as a precursor for sitocalciferol (vitamin D5).

External links
 

Sterols
Vitamin D